Zandin (Zangin) is a rural locality (an ulus) in Mukhorshibirsky District, Republic of Buryatia, Russia. The population was 58 as of 2010. There are 4 streets.

Geography 
Zandin is located 35 km west of Mukhorshibir (the district's administrative centre) by road. Gashey is the nearest rural locality.

References 

Rural localities in Mukhorshibirsky District